The 1976 Speedway World Team Cup was the 17th edition of the FIM Speedway World Team Cup to determine the team world champions.

The final took place at the White City Stadium in London. Australia became only the fourth country to win the title. They ended the run of England by knocking them out in the British qualifying round.

Qualification

British Round
 May 16
  Ipswich, Foxhall Stadium
 Referee:  R. Randborg

* Australia to Final

Scandinavian Round
 May 30
  Tampere, Tampere Stadium

* Sweden to Final

Continental Quarterfinal
 July 13
  Castiglione Olona

* West Germany and Italy to Continental  Semifinal

Continental Quarterfinal
 July 13
  Krško

* Czechoslovakia and Hungary to Continental Semifinal

Tournament

Continental Semifinal
 June 26
  Landshut, Ellermühle Stadium

*West Germany and Czechoslovakia to Continental Final

Continental Final
 July 3
  Slaný

* Poland and Soviet Union to Final

World Final
 September 19
  London, White City Stadium
 Att: 9,000
 Referee:  Gunther Sober

See also
 1976 Individual Speedway World Championship
 1976 Speedway World Pairs Championship

References

1976
World T